Laurent Arriau, known by his stage name Watermät, is a French musical artist and record producer, whose 2014 single "Bullit" appeared on the charts in Belgium, France, Netherlands, Australia and the UK.

Discography

Singles

*Did not appear on the official Belgian Ultratop 50 chart, but rather on the Ultratip chart.

References

French DJs
French record producers
Living people
Tropical house musicians
Electronic dance music DJs
Year of birth missing (living people)